John Whiting was an English actor, dramatist and critic.

John Whiting may also refer to:

John Whiting (MP) (died after 1430), MP for Shaftesbury
John Whiting (anthropologist)
Jack Whiting, John Whiting, cricketer
John Whiting, namesake of Whiting, Vermont
John Lanyon Whiting (1851–1922), lawyer and politician in Ontario, Canada

See also
John Whiting Award